The chestnut-crowned foliage-gleaner (Automolus rufipileatus) is a species of bird in the family Furnariidae.

Distribution and habitat
It is found in Bolivia, Brazil, Colombia, Ecuador, French Guiana, Guyana, Peru, Suriname, and Venezuela.  Its natural habitats are subtropical or tropical moist lowland forest and subtropical or tropical swampland.

References

chestnut-crowned foliage-gleaner
Birds of the Amazon Basin
Birds of Colombia
Birds of the Venezuelan Amazon
Birds of the Ecuadorian Amazon
Birds of the Guianas
Birds of the Peruvian Amazon
Birds of the Bolivian Amazon
chestnut-crowned foliage-gleaner
chestnut-crowned foliage-gleaner
Birds of Brazil
Taxonomy articles created by Polbot